Grady Lynn Allen (January 1, 1946 - December 4, 2012) was a professional American football player who played linebacker in the National Football League (NFL) for five seasons for the Atlanta Falcons.

Born in San Augustine, Texas, Allen played defensive end for Texas A&M from 1965 to 1967.  During his senior year, he was a team captain, was given the annual Aggie Heart award by the team, earned all Southwest Conference honors, and helped the team to its first Cotton Bowl appearance in 27 years, where they upset Alabama 20-16.

Not chosen in the NFL draft, Allen played as a reserve linebacker in 59 games for the Atlanta Falcons over 5 seasons from 1968 until 1972, recording 2 interceptions and 3 fumble recoveries.  Allen played in all 14 games each season, except for 1971, where an injury limited him to 3 games.

Allen was inducted into the Texas A&M Hall of Fame in 1995 and served as president of the Texas A&M Lettermen’s Association in 2006.

Allen died of cardiac arrest on December 4, 2012. His son Dennis was the former Head Coach of the Oakland Raiders and is currently serving as the head coach of the New Orleans Saints.

References

1946 births
2012 deaths
People from San Augustine, Texas
Players of American football from Texas
American football linebackers
Texas A&M Aggies football players
Atlanta Falcons players